This is a list of electoral results for the Electoral district of Middle Swan in Western Australian state elections.

Members for Middle Swan

Election results

Elections in the 1950s

 Two party preferred vote was estimated.

Elections in the 1940s

Elections in the 1930s

 Preferences were not distributed.

References

Western Australian state electoral results by district